Upshot–Knothole Grable was a nuclear weapons test conducted by the United States as part of Operation Upshot–Knothole. Detonation of the associated nuclear weapon occurred 19 seconds after its deployment at 8:30am PDT (1530 UTC) on May 25, 1953, in Area 5 of the Nevada Test Site.

Nuclear weapons test
The codename Grable was chosen because the letter Grable is phonetic for G, as in "gun", since the warhead was a gun-type fission weapon. As a shell, or artillery-fired atomic projectile (AFAP), the device was the first of its kind. The test remains the only nuclear artillery shell ever actually fired in the U.S. nuclear weapons test program.

Grable was the second of only four gun-type warheads ever detonated (the first was Little Boy, the weapon used against Hiroshima, the last two were test firings of the W33; all other atomic weapons were implosion-type weapons). The shell, designated a Mark 9 nuclear weapon, had a diameter of 280 mm (11.02 in), was 1380 mm (54.4 in) long and weighed 364 kg (803 lb).

The detonation of Grable occurred 19 seconds after its firing.  It detonated over 11,000 yards (over 10 km, 6.25 mi) away from the gun it was fired from, over a part of the Nevada Test Site known as Frenchman Flat.  The explosion was an air burst of 160 m (524 ft) above the ground (7 m (24 ft) above its designated burst altitude), 26 m (87 ft) west and 41 m (136 ft) south of its target (slightly uprange).  Its yield was estimated at 15 kilotons, around the same level as Little Boy.  An anomalous feature of the blast was the formation of a precursor, a second shock front ahead of the incident wave.  This precursor was formed when the shock wave reflected off the ground and surpassed the incident wave and Mach stem due to a heated ground air layer and the low burst height.  It resulted in a lower overpressure, but higher overall dynamic pressure, which inflicted much more damage on drag sensitive targets such as jeeps and personnel carriers.  This led strategists to rethink the importance of low air bursts in tactical nuclear warfare.

Some images from Upshot–Knothole Grable were accidentally relabeled as belonging to the Priscilla shot from Operation Plumbbob in 1957. As a consequence many publications including official government documents have the photo mislabeled.

Admiral Arthur W. Radford, at the time the Chairman of the Joint Chiefs of Staff, and Secretary of Defense Charles E. Wilson were present for the test.

Footnotes

External links
The Atomic Cannon, archived from AtomCentral

Explosions in 1953
Nevada Test Site nuclear explosive tests
1953 in Nevada
1953 in military history
Articles containing video clips
May 1953 events in the United States